The following are the squads of the national teams that played in the Copa Centenario Revolución de Mayo, held in 1910 in Argentina. The participating countries were Argentina, Chile and Uruguay. The teams plays in a single round-robin tournament, earning two points for a win, one point for a draw, and zero points for a loss.

Argentina
Head Coach: n/i

Chile
Head Coach:

Uruguay
Head Coach:

Notes

References

1910 in association football
Copa América squads
1910 in Argentine sport